Fanny Fischer (born 7 September 1986 in Potsdam) is a German sprint canoer who has been competing since 1996 and on the senior circuit since 2006. She won a gold in the women's K-4 500 m event at the 2008 Summer Olympics in Beijing and finished fourth in the K-2 500 m event at those same games.

At the ICF Canoe Sprint World Championships, Fischer has won nine medals with three golds (K-1 4 × 200 m: 2009, K-2 200 m: 2007, K-2 500 m: 2007), four silvers (K-2 200 m: 2006, 2009; K-2 500 m: 2009), K-4 500 m: 2010, and two bronzes (K-2 500 m: 2005, 2006).

Fischer served as the main pundit for publicly owned television channel Das Erste during their coverage of the canoeing events at the 2012 Summer Olympics.

Personal life
Fischer's mother, Sarina Hülsenbeck-Fischer, won a gold medal in women's swimming at the 1980 Summer Olympics in Moscow, earning it in the 4 × 100 m freestyle relay (anchor leg). Hülsenbeck competed in the qualifying round of the women's 4 × 100 m medley relay, but not in the final. Her father, Frank, won nine ICF Canoe Sprint World Championships medals in the early 1980s. Her aunt, Birgit Fischer, won twelve medals in canoeing at the Summer Olympics between 1980 and 2004.
When not competing, she serves in the Bundeswehr as a soldier. Fischer's brother, Falco, is also a canoer.

References

1986 births
Living people
Sportspeople from Potsdam
People from Bezirk Potsdam
German female canoeists
Canoeists at the 2008 Summer Olympics
Olympic canoeists of Germany
Olympic gold medalists for Germany
Olympic medalists in canoeing
ICF Canoe Sprint World Championships medalists in kayak
Medalists at the 2008 Summer Olympics
20th-century German women